Jackie Hayes may refer to:

Jackie Hayes (second baseman) (1906–1983), baseball player from 1927 through 1940
Jackie Hayes (catcher) (1861–1905), baseball player from 1882 through 1890
Jackie E. Hayes (born 1961), member of the South Carolina House of Representatives
Jackie Hayes, stage name of actor and artist Roberto Gari

See also
John Hayes (disambiguation)